Southwood Park Historic District is a national historic district located at Fort Wayne, Indiana.  The district encompasses 1,889 contributing buildings, 1 contributing site, 4 contributing structures, and 1 contributing object in a predominantly residential section of Fort Wayne. The area was developed between about 1906 and 1965, and includes notable examples of Colonial Revival, Tudor Revival, Mission Revival, and Bungalow / American Craftsman style residential architecture.  Its development is directly related to the implementation of the 1912 plan for Parks and Boulevards for the city of Fort Wayne by city planner and landscape architect George Kessler.

Notable buildings include the Hutson Drug Store, Hoosier Foods Store, Gollers Dry Cleaning building, First Missionary Church (c. 1920), St. John the Baptist Catholic Church complex, and Missionary Church World Headquarters (c. 1950).

It was listed on the National Register of Historic Places in 2009.

References

External links

Houses on the National Register of Historic Places in Indiana
Historic districts on the National Register of Historic Places in Indiana
Colonial Revival architecture in Indiana
Tudor Revival architecture in Indiana
Mission Revival architecture in Indiana
National Register of Historic Places in Fort Wayne, Indiana
Houses in Fort Wayne, Indiana